Çatören is a village in the Kastamonu District, Kastamonu Province, Turkey. Its population is 156 (2021).

References

Villages in Kastamonu District